Admire Rakti (20 February 2008 – 4 November 2014) was a Japanese Thoroughbred racehorse who won the Diamond Stakes in Japan and the Caulfield Cup in Australia. He died after competing in the 154th Melbourne Cup on 4 November 2014.

Background
Admire Rakti was a bay horse with a white star, bred in Japan by Northern Racing. He was from the first crop of foals sired by Heart's Cry, a horse whose wins included the Arima Kinen and the Dubai Sheema Classic. During his racing career Admire Rakti was owned by Riichi Kondo and trained by Tomoyuki Umeda.

Racing career

2010–2014: racing in Japan
Admire Rakti ran twice as a two-year-old in late 2010, winning an 1800-metre maiden race at Hanshin Racecourse on his second appearance on December 11. In the following year he ran seven times, recording his only success over 2000 metres at Hanshin in September. As a four-year-old he again contested seven races, winning twice at Nakayama Racecourse and taking the 2400 metre Koto Stakes when moved in distance at Kyoto in October. In his last two races of the year he was moved up in class to finish third in both the Listed Andromeda Stakes and the Grade II Kinko Sho.

As a five-year-old, Admire Rakti showed improved form and competed in some of the most prestigious races in Japan. After finishing third on his debut he was moved up in distance to 3400 metres and won the Diamond Stakes at Tokyo Racecourse, beating the 2010 Spring Tennō Shō winner Jaguar Mail by two and half lengths. He failed to win in his remaining six races but finished fourth in both the Tennō Shō and the Japan Cup. In his first two starts of 2014 the horse finished second to Gold Ship at Hanshin before running unplaced in the Tennō Shō.

2014: Australian campaign
In the autumn of 2014, Admire Rakti was sent to Australia, with the Melbourne Cup as his objective. On 18 October, he prepared for the race with a run in the Grade I Caulfield Cup over 2400 metres in which he was ridden by Hong Kong-based Australian Zac Purton. Eleven days before the race he had avoided serious injury after being involved in an incident at the Werribee quarantine station in which he was attacked by his training companion Admire Inazuma.

Starting at odds of 10/1 in the Caulfield Cup, Admire Rakti moved to the outside to make his challenge in the straight, took the lead in the closing stages, and won by half a length from the New Zealand filly Rising Romance, with the Australian favourite Lucia Valentina a further half length away in third place. After the race, his trainer Tomoyuki Umeda said, "I am so happy I am crying. A Japanese horse has never won this race before so I am so honoured to win this race. He had a handicap of 58kg [today] and hasn't done much big racing in Japan so we weren't sure how he would go, but possibly he likes Australia."

2014 Melbourne Cup and death
Admire Rakti's victory at Caulfield meant that his weight for the Melbourne Cup was increased to 58.5 kg, a weight higher than any winner of the race had carried since Think Big in 1975. Admire Rakti started 9/2 favourite, but weakened badly in the last 600 metres and finished last of the twenty-two runners. After the race, he collapsed and died from cardiac arrest after ventricular fibrillation.

Following Admire Rakti's death, Purton commented "I knew he was in trouble when he didn't tow me into the race around halfway from home, so I eased him down straight away, the horse's welfare comes first. It's very sad. He gave me a great thrill at Caulfield and for this to happen to him is just not fair." RSPCA Australia subsequently issued a statement saying, "Events like these are a stark reminder to the community of the real risks to horses associated with racing. Sadly, injury and death are the price some horses pay for our entertainment in a sport that puts intense pressure on animals to perform to the limits of their endurance".

Pedigree

References

External links
Profile on racing.com

2008 racehorse births
2014 racehorse deaths
Racehorses bred in Japan
Racehorses trained in Japan
Filmed deaths in sports
Thoroughbred family 8-f
Horses who died from racing injuries 
Caulfield Cup winners